The Ericsson R310s, produced by Ericsson Mobile Communications, now known as Sony Mobile Communications, was a mobile phone produced in the early 2000s in a rugged body designed for use in environments or ways which might easily damage a standard handset.

Björn Andersson was the development lead, and the device had the internal working name of "Marina". Development work began in 1997 and went on for around two-and-a-half years before the product launch in 2000.

The outside of the body is reinforced with rubber inlays to withstand harsh treatment and to provide a good grip, preventing the phone from being slippery when wet.

It is water resistant, the lid having silicone gaskets and membranes of GORE All-Weather material which prevented water from leaking in.

At the time the R310s was designed, most handsets still had a vulnerable external antenna. The R310s had a so-called "shark fin" antenna which was short and almost flat, and could withstand flexing.

The software was similar to that in other Ericsson phones of the period and the package offered voice dialing, vibrating call alert, and data/fax capabilities.

Aimed at "active lifestyle" users as well as tradespeople and industry, the phone was available in both high-visibility and fashion colours: bright orange and bright yellow, and more sombre blue and green.

The phone survived slightly longer than others launched at the same time due to the lack of a replacement ruggedised model.

References 

 Ericsson R310s information at GSMpedia

R310s
Ericsson
Mobile phones introduced in 2000